The France–Spain border was formally defined in 1659. It separates the two countries from Hendaye and Irun in the west, running through the Pyrenees to Cerbère and Portbou on the Mediterranean Sea.

Features

Main border

It begins in the west on the Bay of Biscay at the French city of Hendaye and the Spanish city of Irun. The border continues eastward along the Pyrenees to Andorra. Then the border continues eastward to the Mediterranean Sea at Cerbère in France and Portbou in Spain.

From west to east, crossing the border:

 Spain
 Gipuzkoa (Basque Country)
 Navarre
 Province of Huesca (Aragon)
 Province of Lleida (Catalonia)
 Province of Girona (Catalonia)
 France
 Pyrénées-Atlantiques (Nouvelle-Aquitaine)
 Hautes-Pyrénées (Occitanie)
 Haute-Garonne (Occitanie)
 Ariège (Occitanie)
 Pyrénées-Orientales (Occitanie)

Llívia
Spain has an exclave in France, Llívia, in the Pyrénées-Orientales.

Pheasant Island
Shortly after the start of the western border, following the course of the river Bidasoa, Pheasant Island located in the middle of the river has a particular border regime: the island is a condominium whose sovereignty is shared between the two countries determined by if it is the first or the second half of a year.

History

Background
The formal layout of the Franco-Spanish border dates back to the signing of the Treaty of the Pyrenees between the kingdoms of Spain and France in 1659. This would be followed by the Treaty of Llivia the following year, which transferred to France the sovereignty of several villages in the valley of Querol.

Later there would be some agreements on specific areas: the agreement signed in Perpignan in 1764, which established the boundaries between Empordà and Coll Pertús and the Elizondo Treaty in 1785 establishing limits on the height of Aldudes is demarcated and Valcarlos.

Bayonne Treaties
The final definition, that for the most part still in force, was conducted with the signing of the Bayonne Treaties between 1856 and 1868. During the mandates of the Queen of Spain Isabel II and French emperor Napoleon III between the two countries were signed several agreements by which the border was established:
 The Treaty of 1856, establishing the boundary between the provinces of Guipuzcoa is demarcated and Navarre.
 The treaty of 1862, which marked the boundaries in the provinces of Huesca and Lleida.
 The treaty of 1866, which did the same from the valley of Andorra to the  Mediterranean Sea.
 Final Act of limits, signed in 1868.

Subsequent amendments
Later both countries concluded agreements under the same point. In 1980 an agreement was signed to define the border into the Bielsa-Aragnouet tunnel, and 1984, during the construction of the road linking the Roncal Valley with Arette, it was agreed a mutual transfer of land of 2710 m2.

In 1995, with the entry into force of Schengen Agreement, border controls for people and goods were abolished, thus ensuring freedom of movement across the border.

Marking

Following the provisions of the treaties of Bayonne, the border is physically marked on the ground by 602 cairns showing the division between the two countries. These markers are numbered from west to east: one located on the Bidasoa and the last in Cap Cerbere, marked with consecutive numbers and letters.

Another 45 cairns mark the border around Llivia; they are numbered anticlockwise from the number 1 at the entrance of the French road RD-68 in the enclave. Maintaining this signaling runs either on behalf of both states.

Crossings

Irun / Hendaye
Ibardin
Larrún
Coll de Banyuls
Col de Lizuniaga
Col de Lizarrieta
Ainhoa / Urdax
Col d'Iguskiegui
Col d'Ispeguy
Col d'Esnazu
Valcarlos / Arnéguy
Port of Larrau
Col de la Pierre Saint-Martin
Pas d'Arlas
Somport
Col du Pourtalet
Port of Boucharo
Aragnouet–Bielsa Tunnel
Col du Portillon
Pont du Roi
Puigcerdà / Bourg-Madame
Col d'Ares
Col du Perthus
Col des Balistres (Portbou / Cerbère)

References

 
1659 establishments in France
1659 in international relations
1659 establishments in Spain
European Union internal borders
Borders of Spain
Borders of France
International borders